Slobodan Branković may refer to:

Slobodan Branković (footballer) (born 1963), Serbian former footballer
Slobodan Branković (sprinter) (born 1967), Serbian former Yugoslavian sprinter and athletics administrator